Anelosimus agnar is a species of spider in the family Theridiidae. The holotype and paratype specimens were collected in Teluk Mahkota, Johor, Malaysia. Both specimens are female; this species currently lack information on males. The spider is named for Agnar Ingólfsson, the father of the discoverer, Ingi Agnarsson. Females can be identified as members of this species by unusually long and flimsy copulatory ducts. Both the holotype and paratype were collected from small webs at the tips of branches, from a forested area next to a beach.

References

Theridiidae
Spiders of Oceania
Spiders described in 2006